Mymensingh Polytechnic Institute or MPI is a polytechnic institute in Mymensingh, Bangladesh, established in 1963.

History 
Mymensingh Polytechnic Institute was established in 1963. Along with 120 students in 1st year and three departments (civil, electrical, mechanical) it starts Diploma-in-Engineering program.

Directorates 
The institute operates under the executive control of the Ministry of Education (MOE) acting through the Directorate of Technical Education (DTE). The academic programmes, and curricula are maintained under the regulation of the Bangladesh Technical Education Board (BTEB). BTEB function under Directorate of Inspection and Audit (DIA), which in turn function under Chief Accounts Office (CAO), and it function under MOE.

Departments 
 Department of Electrical Engineering
 Department of Computer science & Technology
 Department of Eletro-medical Engineering
 Department of Civil Engineering
 Department of Electronics Engineering
 Department of Power Engineering
 Department of mechanical engineering

Seat

Student Dormitory
 Shilpacharjo Joynul Abedin Hall
 Shahid Khairul Jahan Hall
 Mahua Chatri Hall

References

External links 
 

Colleges in Mymensingh District
Education in Mymensingh
Polytechnic institutes in Bangladesh
Educational institutions established in 1963
1960s establishments in East Pakistan